Ravgaon is a village in the Karmala taluka of Solapur district in Maharashtra state, India.

Demographics
Covering  and comprising 796 households at the time of the 2011 census of India, Ravgaon had a population of 3613. There were 1876 males and 1737 females, with 435 people being aged six or younger.

References

Villages in Karmala taluka